The 2008–09 Lithuanian Hockey League season was the 18th season of the Lithuanian Hockey League, the top level of ice hockey in Lithuania. Four teams participated in Group A of the league, and SC Energija won the championship. Group B, which consisted of six teams, was won by LRK Kedainiai.

Group A

Group B

External links
Season on hockeyarchives.ru

Lithuanian Hockey League
Lithuania Hockey League seasons
2008–09 in Lithuanian ice hockey